The Oakfield Grange was an historic clubhouse and community meeting space at 89 Ridge Road in Oakfield, Maine.  Built in 1906 by the local chapter of the Patrons of Husbandry (the Grange), the building was for many years the sole social meeting space of any size in the small rural community.  It was listed on the National Register of Historic Places in 2006.  It has since been demolished.

Description and history
The Oakfield Grange was located at the southwest corner of Ridge Road and Thompson Settlement Road, a short way east of Oakland's rural village center. The roof was gabled at the rear and gable-on-hip at the front. The building was sheathed in wooden clapboards.

The local Grange chapter was organized in 1903, and built this hall in 1906 after two years of planning and fundraising.  The hall was the largest meeting space in town, and held all manner of social events, including dances and private parties, were held there.  From 1910 to 1964 the town held its town meetings there, and it was also used as its polling place.  From 1935 to 1970 it was also used as a gymnasium by Oakfield High School, and its stage hosted performances of school theatrical and musical productions.  The building's condition declined beginning in the 1980s, as agriculture in the town declined and Grange membership languished. The membership stopped holding meetings in the building in 1987. At the time of the building's listing on the National Register of Historic Places in 2006, the Grange organization had only twelve members.  The building has since been demolished.

See also
National Register of Historic Places listings in Aroostook County, Maine

References

Buildings and structures in Aroostook County, Maine
Grange organizations and buildings in Maine
Demolished buildings and structures in Maine
National Register of Historic Places in Aroostook County, Maine
Grange buildings on the National Register of Historic Places in Maine